The chapters of the Japanese manga Ichi the Killer are written and illustrated by Hideo Yamamoto. The series follows Ichi, a killer for a group of outcasts trying to survive in the yakuza world of the red-light district in Kabukichō, Tokyo. The manga was originally serialized in the Shogakukan magazine Weekly Young Sunday. Shogakukan has collected the chapters into ten tankōbon volumes in Japan from 1998 to 2001. The volumes were republished in 2007.

Yamamoto has also written a prequel titled Ichi in 1993. The prequel and an extra story titled The Birth were compiled together into Koroshiya Ichi Bangaihen on September 15, 2007. The manga has been published in France by Tonkam. The manga has been adapted into a film of the same name directed by Takashi Miike and the prequel into a film called 1-Ichi by Masato Tanno. The manga has also been adapted into an original video animation called Koroshiya 1: The Animation Episode 0.

Volume list

References 

Ichi the Killer
Ichi the Killer